Abraham W. Grenthal was a lawyer who served on the New York Assembly from 1925 to 1929. He was a Republican. He received some pushback from African Americans in the party who wanted their own candidates elected.

He lost to Francis E. Rivers in 1929.

References

Year of birth missing
Year of death missing
20th-century American politicians
Republican Party members of the New York State Assembly